Chris Hernandez is an American former reporter for KSHB-TV in the Kansas City, Missouri metropolitan area and a current municipal official in Kansas City's Civil Rights and Equal Opportunity department.

Early life and education 
Hernandez is a native of Shawnee, Kansas, and received a degree in journalism from the University of Kansas.

Broadcast journalism career 
From 1992 until 1999, Hernandez was a reporter for WDAF-TV in Kansas City, Missouri. Prior to that, he had been a reporter for KFDA-TV in Amarillo, Texas.

From 1999 until January 2002, Hernandez worked as a general assignment reporter for WEWS-TV in Cleveland; Hernandez then joined WBBM-TV in Chicago as a general assignment reporter. In April 2004, Hernandez left the station and spent four months backpacking through Mexico and Central America. Once he was done traveling, Hernandez returned to Kansas City in late 2004 to work at KSHB-TV.

Communications work 
In August 2012, Hernandez left KSHB to take a marketing position with the Unicorn Theatre in Kansas City.

Government service 
In 2013, Hernandez resigned from the Unicorn Theatre to take a job working at City Hall in Kansas City, Missouri, as communications director.

In August 2022, Hernandez was demoted from the top communications role at City Hall after Hernandez claimed that Kansas City's city manager, Brian Platt, suggested lying to the news media. Hernandez, who remained a city employee as a special liaison in the city's Civil Rights and Equal Opportunity department, sued the city in December 2022 in an employment discrimination lawsuit. In January 2023, Kansas City's attorneys filed a response to the lawsuit, asking the judge to dismiss the case and noting in its motion that regardless of whether the city manager lied, there is no "law, rule or regulation" that prevents lying to the press.

Personal 
Hernandez and his partner live in the Brookside neighborhood of Kansas City, Missouri.

References 

Living people
American television reporters and correspondents
University of Kansas alumni
American LGBT journalists
American LGBT broadcasters
American male journalists
People from Shawnee, Kansas
People from Kansas City, Missouri
Year of birth missing (living people)
American people of Latin American descent
21st-century LGBT people